

Australia
 Papua and New Guinea
 High Commissioner – David Hay, High Commissioner in Papua and New Guinea (1966–1970)

France
 Afars and Issas –
 Renamed from French Somaliland, 3 July
 Commissioner – Louis Saget, High Commissioner of the Afars and Issas (1967–1969)
 Governing Council – Ali Aref Bourhan, President of the Governing Council (1967–1976)
 French Somaliland – 
 Louis Saget, Governor of French Somaliland (1966–1967)
 Renamed to Territory of the Afars and Issas, 3 July

Portugal
 Angola – Camilo Augusto de Miranda Rebocho Vaz, High Commissioner of Angola (1966–1972)
 Macau – Jose Manuel de Sousa and Faro Nobre de Carvalho, Governor of Macau (1966–1974)

United Kingdom
Bermuda – Roland Robinson, 1st Baron Martonmere, Governor of Bermuda (1964–1972)
 Federation of South Arabia
 Governor – 
 Sir Richard Gordon Turnbull, High Commissioner of South Arabia (1964–1967)
 Sir Humphrey Trevelyan, High Commissioner of South Arabia (1967)
 Minister – Salih al-Awadli, Chief Minister of South Arabia (1966–1967)
 Federation of South Arabia gains independence from United Kingdom as People's Republic of South Yemen, 30 November
 Hong Kong – Sir David Clive Crosbie Trench, Governor of Hong Kong (1964–1971)

Colonial governors
Colonial governors
1967